Simen Kvia-Egeskog (born 26 May 2003) is a Norwegian footballer who plays as a forward for Viking FK.

Career
On 29 June 2021, he signed a professional contract with Viking, lasting until 2024. On 10 July 2021, he made his Eliteserien debut in a 1–1 draw against Strømsgodset. In September 2022, he was loaned out to Norwegian First Division side Skeid.

Personal life
Kvia-Egeskog is the grandchild of Svein Kvia, who played 551 matches for Viking between 1965 and 1980.

Career statistics

References

External links
Profile for Viking FK

2003 births
Living people
Sportspeople from Stavanger
Norwegian footballers
Viking FK players
Skeid Fotball players
Eliteserien players
Norwegian First Division players
Association football forwards
Norway youth international footballers